Hypselodoris apolegma is a species of colourful sea slug or dorid nudibranch, a marine gastropod mollusk in the family Chromodorididae.

Taxonomic history
Recent phylogenetic data confirm the validity of the species and suggest a sister species relationship between Hypselodoris apolegma and Hypselodoris bullockii. A later study revealed a large clade of animals with similar colouration with Hypselodoris brycei as sister species to H. apolegma.

Distribution
This nudibranch is found in the tropical Western Pacific Ocean.

References

External links
 

Chromodorididae
Gastropods described in 2001